The  2022 Superrace Championship  (also known as the 2022 CJ Logistics Superrace Championship) is a South Korean motor racing series for stock cars, production cars and prototypes. It is the 17th season running for the championship and the 16th season both partnered by CJ Group and raced under the moniker Superrace Championship. The championship is contested individually between 5 classes; Super 6000, Kumho GT (GT1 & GT2), Cadillac CT4 Class, BMW M Class and Sports Prototype (Radical) Cup Korea.

Calendar

Teams and drivers

Super 6000 
Since 2020, all teams are currently using the Toyota GR Supra powered with a General Motors 6.2L LS3 V8 engine capable of producing 460 horsepower.

Kumho GT

Season summary

Championship standings

Drivers championships

Scoring system

Super 6000

Teams championships

Super 6000 
The teams championship is decided upon points scored by two drivers per team after each race. Teams with 3 or more drivers have 15 days before each race to select two drivers to add their points towards their final tally.

Tyre manufacturers championships 

In 2022, Superrace announced a new championship for the tyre manufacturers for the Super 6000 class. Hankook Tire, Kumho Tire & Nexen Tire will participate, along with 9 teams who currently use their tyres. Like the teams championship, the tyre manufacturers must select 5 drivers per tyre user 15 days before each round to add their points towards their final tally.

References

External links 
 

Motorsport in South Korea
Superrace Championship